Åsleik Audgar Engmark (27 December 1965 – 12 February 2017) was a Norwegian comedian, actor, singer, director and stage writer, best known for his work as one of the co-founders of the Norwegian cabaret group Lompelandslaget, and as Timon in the Norwegian version of The Lion King.

Career 
Engmark was one of the co-founders of the Norwegian cabaret group Lompelandslaget in 1987. The following year, at the age of 22, he made his solo debut at Det Norske Teatret (The Norwegian Theatre) in Oslo, in the Norwegian original cast of Les Misérables, the third Cameron Mackintosh Les Mis production in the world. He stayed in the ensemble of Det Norske Teatret until 1999. 
In Norway he became known during the 1990s through Norwegian Broadcasting Corporation (NRK), especially on the weekly satire Egentlig, an equivalent to Saturday Night Live.  He was also well known for his many dubbing film voices, such as Timon in the Norwegian version of The Lion King.

In 2009 Engmark made his debut as a film director, with the children's movie Knerten (Twigson English version) (Mein Freund Knerten German version). The movie became a box office hit and was seen by more than 375,000 viewers in Norway. Among many festivals, it participated in the official Generation K Plus section of the Berlinale 2010.
Knerten was awarded Best Children's movie, Best Art Design and Best Visual Effects at the Norwegian Film Awards 2010 Amandaprisen.

In 2010, he won the Norwegian version of Strictly Come Dancing, called Skal vi danse.

Engmark directed, performed and wrote in many different artistic directions. He performed comedy in both Norwegian and English, and won the Norwegian Stå Opp-Prisen (Stand Up Award) in 2001.

Personal life and death 
Engmark lived in Oslo his entire life. In 1997, he married Helle Engmark, his partner of several years. They divorced in 2012.

On 12 February 2017, while in Brussels visiting family, Engmark died suddenly due to an undisclosed medical emergency. He was 51 years old.

Selected film and television actor appearances
2013 Monsters University voice of Mike Wazowski, Disney / Pixar
2011 Knerten i knipe voice of Knerten. Film, Paradox Spillefilm A/S
2010 Skal vi danse participant and winner. Norwegian version of Strictly come dancing / TV2 Norway
2010 Knerten gifter seg (Twigson gets married) voice of Knerten. Film, Paradox Spillefilm A/S
2009 Forsvarskonserten host. Television concert, The Norwegian Army / TV2 Norway
2009 Knerten (Twigson / Knorzel) voice of Knerten. Film, Paradox Spillefilm A/S
2009 Ice Age: Dawn of the Dinosaurs voice of  Buck, Blue Sky Studios / 20th Century Fox
2006 Curious George voice of Ted, Universal Pictures / Imagine Entertainment
2006 Open Season voice of Elliot, Sony Pictures / Colombia
2005 Mulan II voice of Mushu, Disney
2005 Brødrene Dal og mysteriet med Karl XIIs gamasjer as Karl XII. Television drama series, NRK
2004–2005 Løvebakken. Television satire, NRK
2003 Komplottet host. Candid camera, TV3 Norway
2001 Monsters, Inc. voice of Mike Wazowski, Disney / Pixar
2000 Bokken Lasson, sensibel suksess  as Misja. Radio opera, NRK
1998 Asylet IV Television drama series, NRK
1998 Mulan voice of Mushu, Disney
1997 Lära att simma Solo television comedy series, NRK
1995–2010 Toy Story, Toy Story 2 Toy Story 3 voice of Woody, Disney / Pixar
1995 Jakten på Mauritius Television drama series NRK
1994–2004 Lion King, Lion King 2, Lion King 3 voice of Timon, Disney
1994–1995 Aladdin (animated TV series) voice of Genie, Disney
1993–1997 Egentlig Television satire series, NRK
1993 Secondløintnanten (The Last Lieutenant) Film, director Hans Petter Moland
1991–1992 The Adventures of Tintin voice of Tintin
1989 Showbiz eller hvordan bli kjendis på en-to tre! Film
2005 Jack's Big Music Show voice of Jack

Selected theatre and stage appearances
2016 Aladdin and His Magical Europe Refugee Tour 2016 Performer (and writer). Musical/physical comedy, C venues Edinburgh Festival Fringe
2015-2016 Luftforsvarets flyvende sirkus (Airforce' Flying Circus) solo concert with The Royal Norwegian Air Force Band
2014-2016 På grensen til sang (On the edge of singing) musical improv competition, host, Det Andre Teatret
2014 Småtingsvalg 2014 cabaret, Stand Up Norge
2013 Småtingsvalg 2013 cabaret, Stand Up Norge
2012-2014 One Night Stand Up musical improv standup, Stand Up Norge
2012 The Century Anniversary for Norwegian Flying solo concert with The Norwegian Airforce Band 
2011 Sommerlatter 2011 stand up summer show Latter
2010 Sommerlatter 2010 stand up summer show Latter
2008-2011 Improvised concert for comedian and guitarist stand up / concert, Stand Up Norge
2007-2009 Latter Comedy Club Oslo, MC, Stand Up Norge
2006-2009 Lufta er for alle! (Air is for all!) solo concert with Norwegian Airforce Band and Ole Edvard Antonsen
2005 Kveiteprinsen (The Halibut Prince) comic opera, Latter Oslo
2001-2003 Dødsgøy (Dead funny) stand up, Stand Up Norge
2001 A romantic evening solo singer with The Norwegian Ladies Ensemble (Stilett) and Ingrid Bjørnov.
1999 Personkrets 3:1 by Lars Norén, as Heiner. Theatre, Det Norske Teatret
1998 The Black Rider as Uncle/The Duke. Musical, Det Norske Teatret
1997-1999 Åsleik Engmark utleverer sine venner (Å.E. is outing his friends) stand up, Artistpartner
1995-2002 Kristian Qvart Comedy Club Oslo, MC, Stand Up Norge
1995-1997 Dette er Stand Up Comedy! (This is Stand Up Comedy) stand up
1992 Mio, My Son by Astrid Lindgren, as Mio. Theatre, DNT
1992 ULV-ULV! (Wolf-Wolf!). Cabaret, Lompelandslaget
1991 Dear Jelena by Ludmila Razumovskaya, as Vitja, Det Norske Teatret
1991 Sweeney Todd as Toby, Det Norske Teatret
1990 Jesus Christ Superstar Judas/Simon, Det Norske Teatret
1989 Blood Brothers as Mickey, Det Norske Teatret
1989 Treasure Island as Israel Hands. Musical, Chateau Neuf Oslo
1988 Les Misérables as Montparnasse/Bamatabois/Grantaire. Det Norske teatret
1987 Scrooge. Theatre, Teaterverkstedet
1987 Skal de spise den her eller skal den pakkes inn? (Eat it here or wrap it in?) Cabaret, Lompelandslaget

Selected directing, writing, composing
2016 Aladdin and His Magical Europe Refugee Tour 2016 (Performer) and writer. Musical/physical comedy, C venues Edinburgh Festival Fringe
2016 La Boheme director. Ytterøya Bygdetun
2015 Luftforsvarets flyvende sirkus (Airforce' Flying Circus) co-librettist. Concert, Norwegian Airforce Band
2015 Lenge Leve Livet director and writer. Musical/physical theatre, Oslo Nye Teater
2015 EGO director, stand up show Nils Ingar Aadne iStage
2014 Sjøvett med Kruse Knallkul (Safety at sea with Cruiser the Cool Cat) director. 4 x short animation films, Animando / Redningsselskapet 
2013-2014Småtingsvalg 2013/2014 co-writer. Cabaret
2012 Century Anniversary for Norwegian Flying co-librettist. Concert, Norwegian Airforce Band
2009 Knerten (Twigson) director. Film, Paradox Spillefilm A/S
2008-2010 Improvised concert for comedian and guitarist, co-composer
2007 Det minner meg om Oslo 2 co-director, co-composer, writer. Cabaret, Oslo Nye Teater (Oslo New Theatre)
2006 Det minner meg om Oslo co-director, co-composer, writer. Cabaret, Oslo Nye Teater
2006 Lufta er for alle! (Air is for all!) co-librettist. Concert, Norwegian Airforce Band
2006 Ingen er så Moss director, writer, co-composer. Cabaret
2005 Kveiteprinsen (The Halibut Prince) co-librettist. Comic opera, Latter Oslo
2004 Cinderella director, writer. Theatre, Kruttårnteatret
2001 The Emperor's New Groove voice director Norwegian version. Animated film, Disney
1998 Så langt i livet co-writer with De Gyngende Seismologer. Novel/satire autobiography, Cappelen
1994-2016 Written all his own stand up material.
1993-1997 Egentlig co-writer. TV satire, NRK
1992 ULV-ULV! director, co-writer. Cabaret, Lompelandslaget
1990 Sammen er vi huntonitt (Together we are chipboard) director, co-writer. Cabaret, Lompelandslaget
1987 Skal De spise de her...? (Eat it here or wrap it in?) director, co-writer. Cabaret, Lompelandslaget

References

External links
 

1965 births
2017 deaths
Male actors from Oslo
Norwegian male stage actors
Norwegian male comedians
Norwegian stand-up comedians
Norwegian film directors
Norwegian male television actors
Norwegian male film actors
Norwegian male voice actors